Ultraviolet is a 2006 American science fiction action film written and directed by Kurt Wimmer and produced by Screen Gems. The film stars Milla Jovovich as Violet Song, Cameron Bright as Six, and Nick Chinlund as Ferdinand Daxus. It was released in North America on March 3, 2006 to negative reviews and performed poorly at the box office. The film was released on DVD and Blu-ray Disc on June 27, 2006.

Violet Song Jat Shariff, a woman infected with hemoglophagia (a fictional vampire-like disease), lives in a future dystopia where anyone infected with the contagious disease is immediately sentenced to death. With her advanced martial arts skills, a group of rebel hemophages, and a boy named Six, whose blood may contain a cure for the disease, Violet goes on a mission to overthrow the futuristic government and defeat Ferdinand Daxus.

A novelization of the film was written by Yvonne Navarro, with more back-story and character development. The book differs from the film in a number of ways, including a more ambiguous ending and the removal of some of the plot twists. An anime series titled Ultraviolet: Code 044 was released by the Japanese anime satellite television network Animax, and created by Madhouse.

Plot 
In the mid-21st century, an accident occurs in an illegal U.S. biotechnological laboratory, where they tried to create super-soldiers to subjugate the 3rd world, but the project goes wrong. As a result, part of the Earth's population becomes infected with a virus that overwrites and replaces DNA, mutating into hemophages, creatures with vampire fangs that are stronger, faster and smarter than humans, but have very short lifespans due to genetic unravelling.

Humanity starts a war against the hemophages, and they subsequently go underground. As law enforcement agencies are unable to stop the infection, sovereign nations collapsed, human rights are abolished, and due to the state of emergency on the planet, governments establish the ArchMinistry, a powerful corporation and joint world government that usurps the UN and WHO. Hemophage supersoldier Violet Jat Shariff is part of the rebel resistance underground, looking for ways to fight back. 

Violet is tasked with stealing supposedly human-made anti-mutant weapons. Using her superpowers, she alone on a motorcycle attacks the center ("Blood Bank"), where a superweapon is hidden that can destroy hemophages. However, the 9-year-old boy Six turns out to be in the weapons container – a clone of Vice Cardinal Ferdinand Daxus (president of the world) and a carrier of a virus dangerous for hemophages. Violet delivers the boy to the base, but, in a fit of sentimentality, prevents him from being killed by the hemophages.

Violet and her allies plan to create a vaccine that would return her and the hemophages to the human world, but the vice-cardinal's special forces and the hemophages are after her. It is revealed that majority of hemophages have decided to collude with the vice-cardinal, who himself turns out to be a secret hemophage. In the resistance labs, Violet learns that Six does not pose a danger to the hemophages, but for the vice-cardinal he has a mysterious value. Violet eventually learns that Daxus wants to increase his wealth through a new epidemic. an antidote for which people will need to buy daily. Six is the key to these insidious designs. She later finds out that it was Daxus who, in the past, once worked as a laboratory assistant, deliberately arranged an accident in the laboratory in order to subsequently take advantage of the situation to lead the world government. Violet goes through multiple battles, rescuing Six and reviving him as a hemophage, before managing to kill Daxus. Violet swears to protect the world from the hatred in society as she and Six ride off into the sunset.

Cast
 Milla Jovovich as Violet Song Jat Shariff
 Ida Martin as young Violet
 Cameron Bright as Six
 Nick Chinlund as Vice-Cardinal Ferdinand Daxus
 Steven Calcote as young Daxus
 William Fichtner as Garth
 Scott Piper as Garth's assistant
 Sebastien Andrieu as Nerva
 Christopher Garner as Luthor
 Ricardo Mamood-Vega as Song Jat Shariff
 Katarína Jancula as Shariff's new wife (extended cut)
 Jennifer Caputo as Elizabeth P. Watkins
 Duc Luu as Kar Waia
 Kieran O'Rorke as Detective Cross
 Ryan Martin as Detective Breeder
 Digger Mesch as Detective Endera
 Kurt Wimmer (cameo) as Hemophage
 Richard Jackson as Archministry Computer Tech
 Mary Catherine Williams as Purple-haired shopper (extended cut)

Production

Production began in early February 2004 and was shot in various cities across China, most notably Hong Kong and Shanghai. Production was finished in late June 2004. The film was shot digitally on high-definition video using a Sony HDW-F900.

In 2005, the film's trailer was leaked on the internet. Director Kurt Wimmer then visited several message boards and demanded all clips be removed in order to keep the film's plot a secret. The online fan community responded well to this, and all the clips were removed from distribution until the theatrical trailer was publicly released in January 2006. It uses "Clubbed to Death (Kurayamino Edition)" by Rob Dougan as the soundtrack as well as "24" by Jem.

Jovovich was not pleased with the film, having been locked out of the editing processes despite promises to include her input on her performance.

Reception

Critical response
The site's critical consensus states: "An incomprehensible and forgettable sci-fi thriller, Ultraviolet is inept in every regard." On Metacritic the film has a score of 18 out of 100 based on reviews from 19 critics, indicating "Overwhelming dislike". Audiences surveyed by CinemaScore gave the film a grade D+ on scale of A to F.

Frank Scheck of The Hollywood Reporter called it "The latest entry in the 'This film is so bad we're not screening it for critics' genre." He also criticizes the action scenes "Although extravagantly staged, they're more than a little derivative" and "Other sequences are rather more ridiculous".
Robert Koehler of Variety magazine wrote: "Pic is hermetically sealed in a synthetic wrapping that's so total – Sony's top-flight high-def cameras, visibly low-budget CG work, exceptionally hackneyed and imitative action and dialogue – that it arrives a nearly lifeless film."

Box office
Ultraviolet was released in North America on March 3, 2006. The film grossed $9,064,880 in its opening weekend in fourth place. It grossed $18,535,812 domestically and $12,534,399 internationally, which brings the worldwide total of $31,070,211. With budget of $30 million, the film was a box office bomb.

Home media
The film was released on DVD and Blu-ray on June 27, 2006, in North America. There are two versions of the film, an unrated version (94 minutes long) and a PG-13 version (88 minutes long). Additionally, the rough cut of the movie was originally close to two hours long; only 6 minutes of this lost half-hour was restored for the unrated cut. The North American, European, South American, Hong Kong, Korean Blu-ray is the PG-13 version of the film. This is because Sony previously would not allow Unrated or NC-17 content to be released on the then-newly released Blu-ray format, a clause which has since been lifted. However, the Japanese Blu-ray that was released on January 1, 2007, does contain the 94 minute Unrated version of the film, along with all the extras that appeared on the DVD, excluding a few trailers. The film performed quite well in the DVD market, grossing over $35.1 million in rental sales. In the end the film turned in a healthy profit of over $36 million. Despite this, there are no plans for a true restored Director's Cut.

The DVD includes a four-part documentary: "UV Protection: The Making of Ultraviolet" and an audio commentary with Jovovich. Some editions additionally feature some deleted scenes which were cut from the final release. But not all footage from the unrated extended edition was in the deleted scenes feature.

Extended version
The extended DVD version includes additional footage, increasing the running time and adding more to the storyline / plot. In this release there are additional scenes which include:
 A scene giving more in depth information on hemophagia. Including how it elongates canines, improves strength, speed, vision, hearing, bone strength and regenerative abilities, but reduces lifespan to approximately 12 years.
 A flashback that gives more background information about Violet and depicts all the hardships she went through because of all the hemoglophagia testing and how it resulted in the termination of her pregnancy.
 A later scene shows Violet's reaction to her estranged husband's creation of a new life.
 A scene which depicts a conversation between Violet and Six which develops their characters.
 The chase scene between Violet and the soldiers of Daxus is lengthened.
 The level of blood and gore is also increased by a small amount.
 The amount of action is also increased by a small amount.

See also
 Equilibrium (the previous science fiction-action film directed by Kurt Wimmer)
 Gun Kata (a fictional martial art style created in Hong Kong and used by Kurt Wimmer for Equilibrium and Ultraviolet)
 List of dystopian films
 Ultraviolet (novel) (novelization of the film, using the full plot, instead of the film's cut down version)
 Ultraviolet: Code 044 (animated series based on the film)

References

External links

 
 

2006 films
2006 martial arts films
2006 science fiction action films
American martial arts films
American science fiction action films
American superhero films
Vietnamese-language films
American dystopian films
Fictional super soldiers
Fictional vampire hunters
Films directed by Kurt Wimmer
Films set in 2078
Films scored by Klaus Badelt
Films set in the 2070s
Films shot in Hong Kong
Films shot in Shanghai
Films with screenplays by Kurt Wimmer
Girls with guns films
Gun fu films
Martial arts science fiction films
Superheroine films
American vampire films
2000s English-language films
2000s American films